Manihoteae is a tribe of the subfamily Crotonoideae, under the family Euphorbiaceae. It comprises 2 genera.

See also 
 Taxonomy of the Euphorbiaceae

References 

 
Euphorbiaceae tribes